Mohmad Mdether Driss Rajeb (born 13 April 1988) is a Sudanese born-Qatari footballer who plays for Qatari club Al-Sailiya in the Qatar Stars League.

Club career
Rajeb started his career with Al-Ahly Shendi in Sudan and joined in the spring of 2007 to Qatar Stars League club Al-Wakrah. In December 2011 left Al-Wakrah and joined to Qatar Stars League rival Lekhwiya SC. From 2013 to 2016 he played for Al-Arabi SC. In August 2016, he joined Al-Sailiya SC.

References

1988 births
Living people
Sudanese footballers
Qatari footballers
Expatriate footballers in Qatar
Sudanese expatriate footballers
Al-Wakrah SC players
Sudanese expatriate sportspeople in Qatar
Al-Ahly Shendi players
Lekhwiya SC players
Al-Arabi SC (Qatar) players
Al-Sailiya SC players
Association football forwards
Sudanese emigrants to Qatar
Naturalised citizens of Qatar
Qatari people of Sudanese descent